Blumenthal Performing Arts is a non-profit, multi-venue performing arts complex located in Charlotte, North Carolina. It opened in 1992 and is named in honor of the people of the state of North Carolina and the Blumenthal Foundation established by I.D. Blumenthal who founded RSC Brands, the largest private donor to the capital campaign. The idea for the center dates back to the late 1970s. Momentum for the project grew in the 1980s resulting in a $15 million allocation from the state of North Carolina, approval of a $15 million bond by the citizens of Charlotte and an additional $32 million contributed by individuals, corporations and foundations. In 1987 the Belk Brothers donated a valuable piece of land as the site of the new theatre complex. Total construction cost for the Blumenthal Center was over $62 million.

Architecture 
The Blumenthal Center and the adjacent Founder's Hall and Bank of America corporate center were all designed by César Pelli and Associates. Acoustical design was completed by acoustical consultant Kirkegaard Associates. Project management was provided by Theatre Project Consultants (TPC). General contractor on the project was Becon Construction of Charlotte, NC.

Venues 
Blumenthal Performing Arts operates six theaters on three campuses in uptown Charlotte. Blumenthal also presents shows at Ovens Auditorium.

Blumenthal Performing Arts Center

Belk Theater 
The Belk Theater is the largest venue in the Blumenthal Performing Arts Center, seating 2,118 at its full-capacity configuration. It Theater hosts a majority of the performances from Broadway tours and resident companies. Opening in 1992, it was designed by architect Cesar Pelli in a contemporary European horseshoe arrangement. The most distant seat is less than 135 feet from the stage. Features an LED fiber optic chandelier with 2,400 points of light in the audience chamber.

Booth Playhouse 
The Booth Playhouse is a courtyard-style proscenium theater with cabaret and theater-in-the-round capabilities. It contains 434 seats with seating in orchestra and gallery levels. It hosts a variety of dance, choral and other musical ensembles, as well as meetings, seminars, and workshops.

Stage Door Theater 
The Stage Door Theater is a black box-style theater which can seat up to 233 people with flexible layouts. Located at the stage door to the Blumenthal Performing Arts Center, it is the organization's smallest venue.

Levine Center for the Arts

Knight Theater 
The Knight Theater is a proscenium theater with a capacity of 1,192. Adjacent to the Bechtler Museum of Modern Art. Portions of the 2012 film, The Hunger Games, were filmed at the theater.

Spirit Square (under renovation)

McGlohon Theatre 
Opening in 1980 at the First Baptist Church, the McGlohon Theatre was later converted to a proscenium theater with a capacity of 716. It consists of an orchestra and balcony level.

Duke Energy Theater 
The Duke Energy Theater is a black box theater with a capacity of 190.

Ovens Auditorium
Ovens Auditorium is Charlotte's largest performing arts theater with a capacity of over 2,400. Located at the Bojangles Entertainment Complex east of Uptown Charlotte, it features extended Broadway engagements and concerts. Owned by the City of Charlotte and operated by the Charlotte Regional Visitors Authority (CRVA).

Broadway Productions 
The Blumenthal Performing Arts Center hosts Broadway productions through the PNC Broadway Lights Series.  The 2015/16 PNC Broadway Lights series includes: The Sound of Music, Matilda the Musical, Beautiful: The Carole King Musical, The Bridges of Madison County, The Wizard of Oz, If/Then, First Date, and Cabaret. The Blumenthal Center also features the PNC Broadway Extras, which includes Motown the Musical, Beauty and the Beast, Ragtime, the Hip Hop Nutcracker, Kinky Boots, The Book of Mormon, Once, Stomp, and the Blue Man Group.

Economic impact 
Since opening its doors in 1992, 7.3 million people have attended an event, performance, activity or meeting at the Center & Spirit Square.  The Center infused $52.25 million into the economy during the 2007-2008 season.

Resident companies 
NCBPAC is currently home to 6 different resident companies (between the Blumenthal Center complex and Spirit Square) whose goals include visual and performing arts as well as education.  The Duke Power Theatre and the McGlohon Theatre also host annual productions by Charlotte Shakespeare.
 Charlotte Symphony Orchestra
 Community School of The Arts
 North Carolina Dance Theatre
 Opera Carolina
 On Q Productions
 Queen City Theatre
 Charlotte Shakespeare

References

External links 

Homepage
Carolina Tix

Dance in North Carolina
Theatres in Charlotte, North Carolina
Performing arts centers in North Carolina
Tourist attractions in Charlotte, North Carolina
César Pelli buildings